Neftalí Díaz Cajar (born 15 December 1971 in Panama City) is a retired Panamanian football forward.

Club career
Díaz started his career at Euro Kickers, where he formed a lethal strike duo with José "Chepe" Ardines. In January 1997 he moved abroad to play for Salvadoran side FAS. He also had spells in Uruguay with Bella Vista and Basáñez.
Nicknamed Poeta de la Zurda, Díaz returned to San Francisco in summer 2002 after scoring 4 goals in a season at Atlético Veragüense.

He returned to Veragüense in February 2008.

International career
Díaz made his debut for Panama in a June 1992 friendly match against Honduras and has earned a total of 44 caps, scoring 7 goals. He represented his country in 6 FIFA World Cup qualification matches and played at the 1993 CONCACAF Gold Cup.

His final international was a May 2005 friendly match against Venezuela.

Managerial career
In September 2012, he was appointed assistant to new manager José Anthony Torres at Sporting San Miguelito.

References

External links
 

1971 births
Living people
Sportspeople from Panama City
Association football forwards
Panamanian footballers
Panama international footballers
1993 UNCAF Nations Cup players
1997 UNCAF Nations Cup players
2001 UNCAF Nations Cup players
2003 UNCAF Nations Cup players
1993 CONCACAF Gold Cup players
C.D. FAS footballers
C.A. Bella Vista players
San Francisco F.C. players
Atlético Veragüense players
Alianza Panama players
Panamanian expatriate footballers
Expatriate footballers in El Salvador
Expatriate footballers in Uruguay